Rudolf Sergeyevich Atamalyan (born 5 July 1946 in Baku) is a Russian professional football coach and a former player. As of 2009, he coaches 12- to 13-year-old children in a Sochi soccer school.

External links
 Career summary by KLISF

1946 births
Living people
Soviet footballers
Ethnic Armenian sportspeople
Soviet Top League players
FC Ararat Yerevan players
FC Lokomotiv Moscow players
FC Ural Yekaterinburg players
FC Zimbru Chișinău players
FC Tyumen players
Soviet football managers
Azerbaijani expatriates in Moldova
Armenian football managers
Russian football managers
Expatriate footballers in Moldova
FC Tyumen managers
Footballers from Baku
Association football forwards